Amélie Bea Smith (born 2011) is an English child actress. She is known for her roles in the Netflix series The Haunting of Bly Manor (2020), the ITV drama Hollington Drive (2021), and as voice of the titular Peppa Pig (2020–) on Channel 5.

Early life
Smith has two sisters.

Career
Smith began appearing in commercials and short films. She made her television debut in the BBC One soap opera EastEnders as Daisy, a role she would play from 2018 to 2019. In 2020, Smith began voicing the titular Peppa Pig on Channel 5, taking over the role from Harley Bird for the animated show's sixth series. Smith is the fourth actress to voice Peppa Pig. Later that year, she starred as Flora Wingrave in The Haunting of Bly Manor, the second installment of the Netflix anthology The Haunting.

Smith had supporting roles as Eva in the 2021 ITV drama Hollington Drive, for which she was nominated for a National Film Award, and Emily Whitehouse in the 2022 Netflix thriller Anatomy of a Scandal. She shared the role of Charlotte McLean with her younger sister Darcie Smith the Sky Max science fiction series The Midwich Cuckoos and also appeared alongside Darcie in an episode of After Life.

Filmography

References

External links
 
 Amelie Bea Smith at Spotlight

Living people
2011 births
English child actresses
People from Brixton